Tayeb may refer to:

People
 Given name
Tayeb Abdallah (died 2007), former Sudanese president of the Sudanese football (soccer) club Al-Hilal
Tayeb Belaiz (born 1948), Algerian jurist and politician
Tayeb Berramla (born 1985), Algerian football player
Tayeb Guessoum (born 1985), Algerian football player
Tayeb Maroci (born 1985), Algerian football player
Tayeb Salih (1929–2009), Sudanese writer
Tayeb Seddiki, Moroccan playwright, writing in both Arabic and French

 Midname
Mohamed Tayeb Benouis (1948–2007), Algerian aviator, business executive, director general of Air Algérie from 2001 to 2007
Said Tayeb Jawad, the former Ambassador of Afghanistan to the United States
Suleiman Tayeb Ahmed Salem, Ambassador of the Sahrawi Republic to Nicaragua

 Surname
Atef El-Tayeb (1947–1995), Arab Egyptian film director
Ninet Tayeb (born 1983), Israeli pop rock singer
Nour El Tayeb, (born 1993), professional squash player who represented Egypt

Places
For places named "Tayeb" or any of its variations, see Taybeh (disambiguation).

See also
Souk el Tayeb, open-air weekly farmers market in Lebanon that specializes in organic food products
Tayyab
Tayyip (disambiguation)

Arabic masculine given names
Arabic-language surnames